The kezaixian is a bowed string instrument in the huqin family originating in China. More specifically a type of yehu, it is a two-stringed fiddle and is used in Taiwan opera.

Traditionally the khak-a-hian is constructed with a coconut body.

See also 
 Chinese music
 List of Chinese musical instruments
 Huqin

References

Chinese musical instruments
Culture in Hunan
Huqin family instruments